"Through the Fire and Flames", often abbreviated as TTFAF, is a song by English power metal band DragonForce. The song is acclaimed as the most successful song by the band. The song was the lead single and opening track from DragonForce's third album, Inhuman Rampage. It is known primarily for its rapid twin guitar solos by Herman Li and Sam Totman.

The song peaked at #86 on the Billboard Hot 100 and #61 on the Canadian Hot 100 in 2008, making it the band's only single to reach either chart. It also enjoyed briefly renewed popularity in March 2015 when a cover version (Tina S.) uploaded to YouTube became popular, sending the song to number 13 on the Rock Songs chart. It has sold 1.1 million copies in the United States alone and has been certified platinum by the Recording Industry Association of America.

While the song had appeared as a background track in several video games, the inclusion of a playable version of "Through the Fire and Flames" in the rhythm game Guitar Hero III: Legends of Rock as one of the most difficult songs in the game helped to raise the popularity of the song, and it has appeared in numerous rhythm games since.

Composing and recording
This song is written in the key of C minor (but in standard E tuning), and like most other DragonForce songs it is written in a fast tempo of 200 beats per minute with a common time signature (170bpm in the first half of the guitar solo). Near the end of the recording, guitarist Herman Li broke one of his guitar strings. Despite this, the band decided to keep this recording and left it on the final album version.

Music video
The track was used in the first music video by DragonForce. For the video, a shortened version of the song was used, lasting only five minutes.

The simple video primarily shows the band performing the song in a dark room illuminated by amber lights. After the rapid intro riff, guitarist Herman Li holds onto his Ibanez S series guitar with just the whammy bar. During the guitar solos, the camera focuses on Li and Sam Totman alone, with an inset shot of the current player's fretboard. During Li's solos, Totman stands to Li's left drinking. At the start of the solo, a Pac-Man  sound is played by Li, after which he throws the whammy bar he used to make this sound into the air.

The music video circulated through YouTube and various music video channels, including MTV2, and was shown on the monitor screens during the band's performances at Ozzfest 2006.

Personnel
 ZP Theart – lead vocals
 Herman Li – guitars, backing vocals
 Sam Totman – guitars, backing vocals
 Adrian Lambert – bass
 Vadim Pruzhanov – keyboards, piano, backing vocals
 Dave Mackintosh – drums, backing vocals

Charts

Certifications

Compilation appearances
The song appears on two compilation albums: The short version of the song, misnamed as "Through the Fire and the  Flames", appears on MTV2 Headbanger's Ball: The Revenge, released on 11 April 2006. The full version of the song appears on Salvation, Vol. 1, released on 23 October 2007.

Use in video games
Through the Fire and Flames  has also appeared in several video games, first appearing in ATV Offroad Fury Pro around the time of the song's release. In the Guitar Hero rhythm game series, the song first featured in Guitar Hero III: Legends of Rock as an unlockable bonus song, and later appeared in Guitar Hero Smash Hits and Guitar Hero Live. The song also featured in Rocksmith 2014. It is a playable song in Konami's band session arcade games GuitarFreaks and DrumMania V6, and part of the soundtrack for Brütal Legend. It is also one of the most popular songs used by Audiosurf players. The song was also made available for download for Rock Band 3 on 29 March 2011 for both Basic rhythm, and PRO mode which can utilize real musical instruments.

References

2006 singles
DragonForce songs
Songs written by Sam Totman
2006 songs
Sanctuary Records singles
Roadrunner Records singles
Universal Records singles